Gravesend Cricket Club is a cricket club which currently plays in Division 2 of the Kent Cricket League. The club was formed in 1881 when the Harkaway and Clarence Cricket Clubs were amalgamated to form the Gravesend Cricket Club. The Gravesend Cricket Club continues to play at the Bat and Ball Ground which has itself been around for over 150 years (since 1848). First Class Cricket was played at "The Bat" (as it is affectionately known) by Kent County Cricket Club and its Second XI. The highest ever score on the ground came from W.G.Grace with 257 for Gloucestershire in 1895, and the most wickets in a match coming from Tich Freeman for Kent in 1931. The club currently has four running league teams, as well as a 5th XI which play friendly matches. Also, the club operates an exciting youth section with teams ranging from U10 to U19. In Autumn 2011, the club was awarded the ECB "Clubmark" status which acknowledges the colts section of the club.

Cricket Grounds used by Gravesend Cricket Club 
There are two different grounds that are used every week during the season by the four operating league sides and two grounds that are used occasionally by the Sunday sides. The Fifth XI play all of their games away, apart from one game which is annually played at The Bat & Ball against Detling CC. These grounds are:
 The Bat & Ball Ground - Played on alternatively by the First XI and Second XI
 Wombwell Park - Played on alternatively by the Third and Fourth XI
 Nurstead CC - Played on occasionally by the Third, Fourth and Sunday XIs
 GRFCC Ground - Played on occasionally by the Sunday XIs

2010 season 
In the 2010 season, the First XI was pushing for promotion from Division 3 of the Kent Cricket League and after a brilliant season, were promoted as champions. No doubt, the club were very grateful from the help of Jamaica national cricket team player Yannick Elliott who got 37 wickets and 588 runs during the campaign as the club's overseas player. The rest of the 1st XI were also brilliant during the season altogether (including Yannick Elliott) accumulating 137 wickets and 2873 runs.
 First XI top league wicket taker 2010 - Charley Nash - 49
 First XI top league runs scorer 2010 - Charley Nash - 625
 Overall top league wicket taker 2010 - Charley Nash - 49
 Overall top league runs scorer 2010 - Charley Nash - 625

2011 season 
The 2011 season was going to show to be a tough season in Division 2 for the First XI. However, the club managed 4 wins in the first 6 games of the season and were comfortably out of the relegation zone, sitting in the top half of the table. Despite this they went on to lose their next 6 games whilst two were abandoned. They avoided relegation by managing to win two out of the last four games and as a result, they finished 7th in the league with 167 points, 13 points above the relegation zone.
 First XI top league wicket taker 2011 - Dale Clarkson - 21
 First XI top league runs scorer 2011 - Marlon Johnson (overseas player) - 575
 Overall top league wicket taker 2011 - Joshua Hughes - 37
 Overall top league runs scorer 2011 - Marlon Johnson (overseas player) 575

December 2011 was to prove to be a great month for the club - despite it being during the off season. This was due to the club being granted £43,214 by the Sport England's Olympic Legacy Fund. This money was spent on new outdoor nets, a roller, a bowling machine and a new cover for the club to use at the Bat & Ball. All of these things will contribute massively, no doubt, to the growth of the club as a whole and will pave a better path for the club's up-and-coming youth players. Also, it was great news for the club when they found out that newly appointed Assistant Coach of Essex County Cricket Club, Matthew Walker, would be coaching the winter nets sessions for the club. Matt is an ex-player for the club having played there for 13 years as a youth and adult.

2012 season 
The 2012 season ended up being a good season for the club especially for the 2nd XI who managed to gain promotion to the Kent 2nd XI Division 2. They did it in the last game of the season and were promoted by a single point. Elsewhere in the club, the 1st XI remained in Division 2 of the Kent League, the 3rd XI remained in Division 1A Central of the Kent Regional League, and the 4th XI were relegated from Division 2B West of the Kent Regional League. However, the 4th XI did win in their final game of the season against the Hartley Country CC 5th XI. Ironically, the win relegated Hartley as well.

 First XI top league wicket taker 2012 - Robbi Nash - 34
 First XI top league runs scorer 2012 - Pedro Venus - 508
 Overall top league wicket taker 2012 - Robbi Nash - 34
 Overall top league runs scorer 2012 - Pedro Venus - 508

2018 season 
League Positions
 The 1st XI finished 5th in Division III of The Kent Cricket League.
 The 2nd XI finished 5th in Division I of The Kent Cricket League.
 The 3rd XI finished 8th in the Championship West Division of The Kent Regional Cricket League.
 The 4th XI finished 7th in Division 1B West of The Kent Regional Cricket League.
 Batting 
 First XI top league run scorer 2018 - Adnan Pervaiz - 405
 Second XI top league run scorer 2018 - Sumit Ohri - 463
 Third XI top league run scorer 2018 - Ajay Gill - 198
 Fourth XI top league run scorer 2018 - Paramjit Singh - 164
 Top league run scorer 2018 - Sumit Ohri - 500
 Top run scorer 2018 - Zann Ghous - 568
 Bowling 
 First XI top league wicket taker 2018 - Christopher Hinks - 18
 Second XI top league wicket taker 2018 - Indravadan Padhiyar - 21
 Third XI top league wicket taker 2018 - Charlie Agg - 21
 Fourth XI top league wicket taker 2018 - Richard Pannell - 10
 Top league wicket taker 2018 - Charlie Agg - 41
 Top wicket taker 2018 -Charlie Agg - 50
 Fielding 
Most wicket keeping catches 2018 - Gavindeep Basra - 16
Most stumpings 2018 - Gavindeep Basra - 3
Most catches 2018 - Charlie Agg - 11
Most run outs 2018 - Finley Mason-Myers & Dev Rana - 3
Most fielding wickets 2018 - Charlie Agg - 13
 Colts Cricket 
 The U15s won The Medway U15 Cup 2018
 The U12s won The Harry Bright U12 Cup

2019 season 
League Positions

The 1st XI finished 5th in Division III of The Kent Cricket League.
The 2nd XI finished 6th in Division I of The Kent Cricket League.
The 3rd XI finished 5th in the Championship West Division of The Kent Regional Cricket League.
The 4th XI finished 5th in Division 1B Central of The Kent Regional Cricket League.

Batting

 First XI top league run scorer 2019 - Usman Pervaiz - 481
 Second XI top league run scorer 2019 - Daoud Khalid - 325
 Third XI top league run scorer 2019 - James Conway - 304
 Fourth XI top league run scorer 2019 - Shumshair Haider - 309
 Top league run scorer 2019 - Usman Pervaiz - 482
 Top run scorer 2019 - Verinder Bhoombla - 669

Bowling

 First XI top league wicket taker 2019 - Arun Rana - 19
 Second XI top league wicket taker 2019 - Christopher Hinks - 25
 Third XI top league wicket taker 2019 - Ajay Gill - 19
 Fourth XI top league wicket taker 2019 - Shabaan Iqbal - 19
 Top league wicket taker 2019 - Regan Whitfield - 44
 Top wicket taker 2019 - Charlie Agg - 63

Fielding

 Most wicket keeping catches 2019 - Sonny Williams - 15
 Most stumpings 2019 - Sonny Williams & Gavindeep Basra - 6
 Most catches 2019 - Andreas Elia - 16
 Most run outs 2019 - Lalli Nagra - 5
 Most fielding wickets 2019 - Andreas Elia - 18

 Colts Cricket 

 The U17s won The Medway U17 Cup 2019 & The Medway Youth Cricket League U17 2019
 The U13s won The Medway U13 Cup 2019

Notable ex-players and Club Legends 
 Simon Hinks - (1960-): Played for the club during the 1970s and early 1980s before going on to play First Class and List A cricket for Kent and Gloucestershire.
 Matthew Walker - (1974-): Played for the club for 13 years during the late 1980s and 1990s before going on the play First Class cricket for both Kent and Essex as well as List A. Also played for England U19 and became the Head Batting Coach at Essex taking over from Graham Gooch in the winter of 2011. He now plies his trade at his old stomping ground, Kent County Cricket Club, as Head Coach, after joining as Assistant Coach in the winter prior to the 2014 season.
 Jonathan Hinks - (1964-): Played for the club during the late 1970s and 1980s, before going on to play Second XI Cricket for Kent. He then came back to the club in the late 1990s to continue to play club cricket, and now uses his spare time to coach for Gravesham and Dartford District. Jon also holds the record score on the ground for Gravesend, scoring 200 not out during a First XI league game.

References 

English club cricket teams
1881 establishments in England